The 1999 IAAF Combined Events Challenge was the second edition of the annual competition for decathletes and heptathletes, organised by the world's governing body IAAF.

Men

Women

References
 decathlon2000

Combined Events Challenge
1999